Sir William Hody (born before 1441, died 1524) of Pilsdon in Dorset, was an English lawyer, judge and politician who served as Attorney General of England and Chief Baron of the Exchequer under King Henry VII.

Origins
He was born before 1441, the second son of Sir John Hody (d. 1441), Chief Justice of the King's Bench. His sister, Elisabeth Hody, married Sir Robert Strode of Parnham House, Dorset which they re-built from 1522.

Career
His name is first mentioned in the year-books in 1476. He procured a reversal of the attainder of his uncle, Sir Alexander Hody (of Bowre, Somerset), who had been attainted at Edward IV's accession for adherence to the House of Lancaster during the wars of the Roses. 

In 1485, shortly after the accession of King Henry VII, Hody became Attorney General for England and Wales. On 29 October 1486 he was appointed Chief Baron of the Exchequer. He retired as a judge in 1522.

Marriage and children
William Hody married (1st) Eleanor Malet, daughter of Sir Baldwin Malet of 'Corypool' (now Curry Mallet) in Somerset, Solicitor General to King Henry VIII, who was the second son of Thomas Malet (died 1502) by his wife Joan Wadham, daughter of Sir William Wadham. By his wife he had two sons and two daughters:
Reignold Hody, eldest son;
William Hody of Pilsdon, 2nd son, who married twice: (1st) to Margery Keyne, daughter and heiress of Anthony Keyne, of Kent, by whom he had three sons: Richard, John and William; He married (2nd) Anne Strode,  daughter of John Strode, of Chalmington, Dorset, by whom he had a daughter Mary Hody (d.19 November 1588), wife of Sir Thomas Carew (1518-1586) of Haccombe in Devon. The separate monumental brasses of Mary Hody and her husband survive in Haccombe Church. Mary's brass shows the arms of Carew impaling Hody and is inscribed in Latin as follows:
Hic jacet Maria Carew uxor Thomae Carew de Haccombe, Arm(igeri) & filia Will(elmi) Huddye de com(itatu) Dorset, Arm(igeri), quae obiit 19 die Nov(embris) A(nno) D(omini) 1588 ("Here lies Mary Carew, wife of Thomas Carew of Haccombe, Esquire, and a daughter of William Huddye from the county of Dorset, who died on the 19th day of November in the year of our Lord 1588").
Joan Hody, wife of Sir Richard Warre (died 1601) of Hestercombe;
Eme Hody, wife of Lawrence Wadham, a son of Sir William Wadham of Merryfield, Ilton in Somerset and of Edge, Branscombe in Devon.

Death
Hody died on 18 June 1524.

Notes

Attribution

|-

|-

1524 deaths
15th-century English judges
16th-century English judges
English MPs 1472
Chief Barons of the Exchequer
Attorneys General for England and Wales
William
Year of birth uncertain
English MPs 1483
Members of the Parliament of England (pre-1707) for Totnes